The Northgate Border Crossing connects the cities of Bowbells, North Dakota and Alameda, Saskatchewan on the Canada–US border. North Dakota Highway 8 on the American side joins Saskatchewan Highway 9 on the Canadian side.

Canadian side
The office operated under the administrative oversight of the Port of North Portal. A replacement facility, called Boundary Line, was constructed at the border in 1913. That year, the Grand Trunk Pacific Railway had built southward to connect with the Great Northern Railway building northward. In 1916/17, the office name changed to Northgate. During Prohibition in Saskatchewan, the smuggling of liquor northward through Northgate could turn violent.

The customs building was replaced in 1964. The former building was razed in 2014/15.

In 2020, the hours changed from being 8am to 9pm (summer) and 9am to 10pm (winter) to 8am to 4pm (summer) and mirroring the US winter hours.

US side
The early border patrol history is unclear, but assumedly the US mirrored the establishment of a permanent post at least by the 1910s.

The US upgraded its border station on Highway 8 in 2004.

Highway realignment and rail upgrade

After being idle for years, the Canadian National Railway upgraded its tracks at this crossing to support rail traffic from the Bakken oil field.

See also
 List of Canada–United States border crossings

References 

Canada–United States border crossings
Geography of Saskatchewan
Transportation in Burke County, North Dakota